John Patrick Platten (born 17 March 1963) is a retired Australian rules footballer.

Platten's career began in the SANFL, where he won a Magarey Medal with Central District, and also with Hawthorn, where he played in four premierships as well as winning the 1987 Brownlow Medal. Platten remains a popular and respected figure at both clubs, and is also an inductee in both the AFL and SANFL Halls of Fame.

Platten also competed in the Gladiator Team Sports Challenge in 1995.

Career

Platten was born in South Australia. He began (and ended) his career with Central Districts in the SANFL: a junior with Centrals, he commenced in the junior ranks in 1979 and made his league debut in 1981. 

Platten immediately made an impact with Centrals, becoming a full State Representative in 1982, and continued to be a regular in the state team throughout his career. Platten's greatest achievement at Centrals was his 1984 Magarey Medal win.

Platten was recruited to Carlton but after a protracted legal case eventually joined Hawthorn for the 1986 season. Keeping the number 44 on the back of his guernsey, he went on to play for the Hawks from 1986 to 1997, playing 258 games and kicking 228 goals. Nicknamed "The Rat" with his diminutive frame and unruly tangle of curly hair, he cut a distinctive if unlikely-looking footballer, yet despite this, he enjoyed a career that saw him firmly established as one of the best players of the 1980s and early '90s. He was a gutsy rover who won a Brownlow Medal in 1987, tying with Tony Lockett. He played in four VFL/AFL premierships with Hawthorn, in 1986, 1988, 1989, and 1991, and a State of Origin Carnival Championship for South Australia in 1988.

In 1998, Platten retired from the Hawthorn Football Club and made a dramatic return to Central District along with Gilbert McAdam, another of the Bulldogs' all-time greats. Platten kicked the match-winning goal of his comeback match against Glenelg at Elizabeth Oval, however, injury plagued his long-awaited comeback and he retired from football all together after sustaining a knee injury mid-season. His return to Elizabeth Oval was not the success it was hoped for but was a joyous event for long-time Centrals fans regardless. Platten has been a notable attendee at Centrals recent premiership successes, an achievement he was never to enjoy with his boyhood club.

Platten now coaches country football in South Australia. He played 107 games for Central District in the SANFL, for a career total of 365 games in elite football, and was also the club's best and fairest in 1984 and 1985, as well as its leading goalkicker in 1981 and 1985. He won the  All-Australian selection five times: from 1985 to 1988, when the team was selected based on interstate carnival performances, and in 1992 when the team was selected based on AFL premiership performances.

He also runs his own business called The Safety Hub, specializing in the supply of safety equipment.

Playing statistics

*10 games required to be eligible.

|- style="background-color: #EAEAEA"
! scope="row" style="text-align:center;" | 1986
|style="text-align:center;"|
| 44 || 25 || 31 || 36 || 332 || 175 || 507 || 61 ||  || 1.2 || 1.4 || 13.3 || 7.0 || 20.3 || 2.4 || 
|-
! scope="row" style="text-align:center" | 1987
|style="text-align:center;"|
| 44 || 26 || 33 || 30 || bgcolor="b7e718"| 411 || 222 || bgcolor="DD6E81"| 633 || 64 || 49 || 1.3 || 1.2 || 15.8 || 8.5 || 24.3 || 2.5 || 1.9
|- style="background-color: #EAEAEA"
! scope="row" style="text-align:center;" | 1988
|style="text-align:center;"|
| 44 || 22 || 21 || 18 || 383 || 141 || 524 || 56 || 39 || 1.0 || 0.8 || 17.4 || 6.4 || 23.8 || 2.5 || 1.8
|-
! scope="row" style="text-align:center;" | 1989
|style="text-align:center;"|
| 44 || 22 || 16 || 22 || 406 || 134 || 540 || 80 || 42 || 0.7 || 1.0 || 18.5 || 6.1 || 24.5 || 3.6 || 1.9
|- style="background:#eaeaea;"
! scope="row" style="text-align:center" | 1990
|style="text-align:center;"|
| 44 || 19 || 19 || 13 || 249 || 76 || 325 || 48 || 20 || 1.0 || 0.7 || 13.1 || 4.0 || 17.1 || 2.5 || 1.1
|-
! scope="row" style="text-align:center;" | 1991
|style="text-align:center;"|
| 44 || 23 || 25 || 24 || 390 || 161 || 551 || 56 || 65 || 1.1 || 1.0 || 17.0 || 7.0 || 24.0 || 2.4 || 2.8
|- style="background:#eaeaea;"
! scope="row" style="text-align:center" | 1992
|style="text-align:center;"|
| 44 || 22 || 20 || 16 || 371 || 137 || 508 || 51 || 38 || 0.9 || 0.7 || 16.9 || 6.2 || 23.1 || 2.3 || 1.7
|-
! scope="row" style="text-align:center" | 1993
|style="text-align:center;"|
| 44 || 18 || 15 || 15 || 267 || 95 || 362 || 45 || 43 || 0.8 || 0.8 || 14.8 || 5.3 || 20.1 || 2.5 || 2.4
|- style="background:#eaeaea;"
! scope="row" style="text-align:center" | 1994
|style="text-align:center;"|
| 44 || 23 || 16 || 8 || 333 || 151 || 484 || 67 || 58 || 0.7 || 0.3 || 14.5 || 6.6 || 21.0 || 2.9 || 2.5
|-
! scope="row" style="text-align:center" | 1995
|style="text-align:center;"|
| 44 || 19 || 9 || 9 || 246 || 99 || 345 || 41 || 44 || 0.5 || 0.5 || 12.9 || 5.2 || 18.2 || 2.2 || 2.3
|-style="background:#eaeaea;"
! scope="row" style="text-align:center" | 1996
|style="text-align:center;"|
| 44 || 21 || 9 || 12 || 254 || 117 || 371 || 56 || 54 || 0.4 || 0.6 || 12.1 || 5.6 || 17.7 || 2.7 || 2.6
|-
! scope="row" style="text-align:center" | 1997
|style="text-align:center;"|
| 44 || 18 || 14 || 10 || 208 || 111 || 319 || 56 || 34 || 0.8 || 0.6 || 11.6 || 6.2 || 17.7 || 3.1 || 1.9
|- class="sortbottom"
! colspan=3| Career
! 258
! 228
! 213
! 3850
! 1619
! 5469
! 681
! 486
! 0.9
! 0.8
! 14.9
! 6.3
! 21.2
! 2.6
! 2.1
|}

Honours and achievements

Team
AFL Premiership (Hawthorn): 1986, 1988, 1989, 1991
McClelland Trophy (Hawthorn): 1986, 1988, 1989
Night Premiership (Hawthorn): 1986
Pre-season Cup (Hawthorn): 1988, 1991, 1992

Individual
Brownlow Medal: 1987
All-Australian: 1985, 1986, 1987, 1988, 1992
Peter Crimmins Medal: 1987, 1994

Other Achievements
John Platten was one of 113 inaugural inductees into the South Australian Football Hall of Fame in 2002 and in 2003 he was inducted into the Australian Football Hall of Fame.

References

External links
Central District Football Club website
 Hawthorn team of the Century
 
 John Platten's business 

1963 births
Living people
All-Australians (1953–1988)
Australian Football Hall of Fame inductees
Brownlow Medal winners
Peter Crimmins Medal winners
Magarey Medal winners
Hawthorn Football Club players
Hawthorn Football Club Premiership players
Central District Football Club players
South Australian State of Origin players
Australian rules footballers from South Australia
All-Australians (AFL)
South Australian Football Hall of Fame inductees
Australia international rules football team players
Four-time VFL/AFL Premiership players